Sir James Brown Dougherty,  (13 November 1844 – 3 January 1934) was an Irish clergyman, academic, civil servant and politician.

Dougherty was born in Garvagh, County Londonderry, Ireland, to Archibald Dougherty, Esq., M.R.C.S., a surgeon, and Martha Dougherty (née Brown) of Garvagh. He was educated at Queen's College, Belfast, and at Queen's University, Belfast (B.A. 1864 & M.A., 1865).

In 1880, he married Mary Dougherty (née Donaldson) (d.1887), of The Park, Nottingham, with whom he had  a son, John Gerald Dougherty (b. 1883). In 1888, he married Elizabeth Dougherty (née Todd), of Oaklands, Rathgar, County Dublin.

Ordained a Presbyterian minister, he was Professor of Logic and English at then-Presbyterian Magee College, Londonderry from 1879 to 1895. He served as Assistant Commissioner on the Educational Endowments Commission of Ireland (1885–92) and was Commissioner of Education from 1890 to 1895. He became Professor of Logic and English at Magee College in Londonderry in 1879, holding the post until 1895.  In 1895, he was appointed Assistant Under-Secretary to the Lord-Lieutenant of Ireland (Lord Houghton) and became Under-Secretary for Ireland in 1908. He was appointed Clerk to H.M.'s Privy Council, and Deputy Keeper of the Privy Seal in 1895. He became a Liberal MP for Londonderry City from 1914–18, succeeding fellow Liberal David Cleghorn Hogg. He was succeeded by Eoin MacNeill of Sinn Féin in the 1918 general election.

Honours
Dougherty was appointed a Companion of the Order of the Bath (Civil Division) (CB) in the 1900 Birthday Honours list. He was appointed a Knight Bachelor in the 1902 Coronation Honours list published on 26 June 1902, and was knighted by the Lord Lieutenant of Ireland, Earl Cadogan, at Dublin Castle on 11 August 1902. He was appointed a Companion of the Royal Victorian Order (CVO) in 1903; advanced to a Knight Commander of the Bath (Civil Division) (KCB) in 1910; and promoted to a Knight Commander of the Royal Victorian Order (KCVO) in 1911.

References

External links
 
 

1844 births
1934 deaths
People from Garvagh
Presbyterian ministers from Northern Ireland
Irish Liberal Party MPs
Members of the Parliament of the United Kingdom for County Londonderry constituencies (1801–1922)
Members of the Privy Council of Ireland
Alumni of Queen's University Belfast
Academics of Ulster University
UK MPs 1910–1918
Knights Bachelor
Knights Commander of the Royal Victorian Order
Knights Commander of the Order of the Bath
20th-century Irish civil servants
Civil servants in Ireland (1801–1922)
Under-Secretaries for Ireland